Agathemera is a genus of stick insects in the suborder Euphasmatodea and superfamily Pseudophasmatoidea.  It consists of several species limited to the mountainous regions of Argentina, Bolivia, Chile and Peru.

This genus is the sole representative of the monotypic family Agathemeridae and tribe Agathemerini; it was also placed in the suborder Agathemerodea, but the latter is now considered of doubtful validity.

Species

The Phasmida Species File includes following species:
 Agathemera claraziana (Saussure, 1868)
 Agathemera crassa (Blanchard, 1851) - type species (as Anisomorpha pardalina Westwood)
 Agathemera elegans (Philippi, 1863)
 Agathemera grylloides (Westwood, 1859)
 Agathemera luteola Camousseight, 2006
 Agathemera maculafulgens Camousseight, 1995
 Agathemera mesoauriculae Camousseight, 1995
 Agathemera millepunctata Redtenbacher, 1906

References

External links

Phasmid Study Group: Agathemerodea

Phasmatodea genera
Insects of South America
Taxa named by Carl Stål